Rouge Valley Public School (often abbreviated to RVPS) is a school providing education until Grade 8 in Rouge, Toronto, Canada. 
It is located at 30 Durnford Road, Toronto, Ontario M1B 4X3. It is managed by the Toronto District School Board.

About the school
Rouge Valley Public School opened in May, 1992.  Rouge Valley's enrollment is approximately 325 students from Junior KG to Grade 8. YMCA Daycare also operates a Daycare Facility on the premises which has daycare services as well as morning and after school programs for school-aged children.

External links
Rouge Valley Public School Website
Google Maps to Rouge Valley Public School

Educational institutions established in 1992
Schools in the TDSB
1992 establishments in Ontario